Neopterin is an organic compound belonging to the pteridine class of heterocyclic compounds.

Neopterin belongs to the chemical group known as pteridines. It is synthesised by human macrophages upon stimulation with the cytokine interferon-gamma and is indicative of a pro-inflammatory immune status. Neopterin serves as a marker of cellular immune system activation. In humans neopterin follows a circadian and circaseptan rhythm.

Biosynthesis
The biosynthesis of neopterin occurs in two steps from  guanosine triphosphate (GTP). The first being catalyzed by GTP cyclohydrolase, which opens the ribose group.  Phosphatases next catalyze the hydrolysis of the phosphate ester group.

Neopterin as disease marker

Measurement of neopterin concentrations in body fluids like blood serum, cerebrospinal fluid or urine provides information about activation of cellular immune activation in humans under the control of T helper cells type 1. High neopterin production is associated with increased production of reactive oxygen species, neopterin concentrations also allow to estimate the extent of oxidative stress elicited by the immune system. 

Increased neopterin production is found in, but not limited to, the following diseases:

Viral infections including human immunodeficiency virus (HIV), hepatitis B and hepatitis C, SARS-CoV-1, SARS-CoV-2.
Bacterial infections by intracellular living bacteria such as Borrelia (Lyme disease), Mycobacterium tuberculosis, and Helicobacter pylori.
parasites such as Plasmodium (malaria)
Autoimmune diseases such as rheumatoid arthritis (RA) and systemic lupus erythematosus (SLE)
Malignant tumor diseases
Allograft rejection episodes.
A leukodystrophy called Aicardi-Goutieres syndrome
Depression and somatization.

Neopterin concentrations usually correlate with the extent and activity of the disease, and are also useful to monitor during therapy in these patients. Elevated neopterin concentrations are among the best predictors of adverse outcome in patients with HIV infection, in cardiovascular disease and in various types of cancer.

In the laboratory it is measured by radioimmunoassay (RIA), ELISA, or high-performance liquid chromatography (HPLC). It has a native fluorescence of wavelength excitation at 353 nm and emission at 438 nm, rendering it readily detected.

References
 Cavaleri et al. Blood concentrations of neopterin and biopterin in subjects with depression: A systematic review and meta-analysis. Progr Neuropsychopharmacol Biol Psychiatry 2023;120:110633.
 Murr C, et al. Neopterin as a marker for immune system activation. Curr Drug Metabol 2002;3:175-187.
 Fuchs D, et al. The role of neopterin in atherogenesis and cardiovascular risk stratification. Curr Med Chem 2009;16:4644-4653.
 Sucher R, et al. Neopterin, a prognostic marker in human malignancies. Cancer Lett 2010;287:13-22.
 Zeng B, et al. Serum neopterin for early assessment of severity of severe acute respiratory syndrome. Clin Immunol 2005;116(1):18-26.
 Roberston J, et al. Serum neopterin levels in relation to mild and severe COVID-19. BMC Infect Dis 2020;20(1):942.

External links
 NeoPterin.net
 Determination of neopterin and biopterin by liquid chromatography coupled to tandem mass spectrometry (LC-MS/MS) in rat and human plasma, cell extracts and tissue homogenates (a protocol)

Metabolism
Immunology
Pteridines
Triols